Michael Askill is an Australian percussionist. He is a founding member of Synergy Percussion and Southern Crossings. He has been a principal with the Sydney and Melbourne Symphony Orchestras and the Australian Chamber Orchestra.

Along with Nigel Westlake he was nominated for the 1991 ARIA Award for Best Original Soundtrack, Cast or Show Album for Road to Xanadu - The Genius That Was China.

Discography

Albums

Awards and nominations

ARIA Music Awards
The ARIA Music Awards is an annual awards ceremony that recognises excellence, innovation, and achievement across all genres of Australian music. They commenced in 1987. 

! 
|-
| 1991
| Road to Xanadu - The Genius That Was China (with Nigel Westlake)
| Best Original Soundtrack, Cast or Show Album
| 
| 
|-

References

21st-century Australian musicians
Living people
20th-century Australian musicians
Australian percussionists
Year of birth missing (living people)